The Government Unani and Ayurvedic Medical College and Hospital is a graduate, non-profit medical college, and associated hospital, located in Dhaka, Bangladesh. It was established on 10 March 1989.

There are two courses BUMS (Bachelor of Unani Medicine & Surgery) and BAMS (Bachelor of Ayurvedic Medicine & Surgery) 5 years with 1-year internship are affiliated by pharmacy faculty of Dhaka University.

The college has its own anatomy museum, physiology & pathology practical lab, Unani Adviyah museum with air-conditioned, Ayurvedic Drobyaguna museum with air-conditioned, garden of three herbal medicinal plants, air-conditioned library & projector room, computer lab with internet connection, college student council, internee doctors' association (IDA), college central mosque, general hospital including 150 beds, drug production house. Two college halls for boys & girls, a teacher's quarters & a staff quarters, etc.

References
 https://web.archive.org/web/20120327160455/http://nasmis.dghs.gov.bd/inst_info/show_details.php?%20id=51
 https://web.archive.org/web/20110907080108/http://www.cmedhaka.gov.bd/

Unani medicine organisations
Ayurvedic colleges
Medical colleges in Bangladesh
Universities and colleges in Dhaka
Hospitals in Dhaka
Educational institutions established in 1989
1989 establishments in Bangladesh